MMDA (3-methoxy-4,5-methylenedioxyamphetamine; 5-methoxy-MDA) is a psychedelic and entactogen drug of the amphetamine class. It is an analogue of lophophine, MDA, and MDMA.

MMDA was described by Alexander Shulgin in his book PiHKAL. Shulgin lists the dosage range of MMDA as 100–250 mg. The first effects appear within 30–60 minutes following oral administration. MMDA produces euphoria and loving warmth, and attenuates feelings such as anxiety and loneliness. MMDA also produces closed eye visuals, a state of drowsiness, muscle relaxation, and time distortion. Side effects include moderate mydriasis, dizziness, sensations of heat or cold, and trembling. The imagery is generally realistic, and often related to everyday perception of people, landscapes, or objects. The effects of MMDA usually reach a peak during the first hour following the initial effects, and begin to wane during the second hour, and usually completely disappear by the end of the fifth hour.

Psychotherapeutic actions 
In his 1973 book, The Healing Journey, Claudio Naranjo explored the psychotherapeutic potential of MMDA. Like MDA, he found that MMDA facilitates communication and suggested it has potential applications in psychotherapy. Worldwide , MMDA has not been approved for any human applications.

Pharmacology 
MMDA has been shown to act as a non-neurotoxic serotonin releasing agent with no effects on dopamine release and probably norepinephrine release as well, and as a 5-HT2A receptor agonist. The latter property is responsible for its psychedelic effects, whereas the former mediates its mood-lifting and empathogenic effects.

Legal Status

United States
MMDA is classified as a Schedule 1 substance in the United States, and is similarly controlled in other parts of the world. It’s important to note that MMDA remain’s illegal, however it’s classified different that MDMA’s illegality. Internationally, MMDA is a Schedule I drug under the Convention on Psychotropic Substances.

Australia
MMDA is considered a Schedule 9 prohibited substance in Australia under the Poisons Standard (October 2015). A Schedule 9 substance is a substance which may be abused or misused, the manufacture, possession, sale or use of which should be prohibited by law except when required for medical or scientific research, or for analytical, teaching or training purposes with approval of Commonwealth and/or State or Territory Health Authorities.

See also 
 3,4-Methylenedioxyamphetamine (MDA)
 Lophophine
 Trimethoxyamphetamine (TMA)

References

External links 
 PiHKAL entry for MMDA
 PiHKAL • info entry for MMDA 
 MMDA: A New Psychotomimetic Agent
 Animal Pharmacology and Human Psychopharmacology of MMDA
 A Pharmacological Comparison of MMDA and LSD In The Dog

Substituted amphetamines
Designer drugs
Entactogens and empathogens
Benzodioxoles
Phenol ethers
Serotonin receptor agonists
Serotonin releasing agents